The rabies vaccine is a vaccine used to prevent rabies. There are a number of rabies vaccines available that are both safe and effective. They can be used to prevent rabies before, and, for a period of time, after exposure to the rabies virus, which is commonly caused by a dog bite or a bat bite.

Doses are usually given by injection into the skin or muscle. After exposure, the vaccination is typically used along with rabies immunoglobulin. It is recommended that those who are at high risk of exposure be vaccinated before potential exposure. Rabies vaccines are effective in humans and other animals, and vaccinating dogs is very effective in preventing the spread of rabies to humans. A long-lasting immunity to the virus develops after a full course of treatment.

Rabies vaccines may be used safely by all age groups. About 35 to 45 percent of people develop a brief period of redness and pain at the injection site, and 5 to 15 percent of people may experience fever, headaches, or nausea. After exposure to rabies, there is no contraindication to its use, because the untreated virus is overwhelmingly fatal.

The first rabies vaccine was introduced in 1885 and was followed by an improved version in 1908. Millions of people globally are vaccinated against the virus. It is on the World Health Organization's List of Essential Medicines.

Medical uses

Before exposure
The World Health Organization (WHO) recommends vaccinating those who are at high risk of the disease, such as children who live in areas where it is common. Other groups may include veterinarians, researchers, or people planning to travel to regions where rabies is common. Three doses of the vaccine are given over a one-month period on days zero, seven, and either twenty-one or twenty-eight.

After exposure
For individuals who have been potentially exposed to the virus, four doses over two weeks are recommended, as well as an injection of rabies immunoglobulin with the first dose. This is known as post-exposure vaccination. For people who have previously been vaccinated, only a single dose of the rabies vaccine is required. However, vaccination after exposure is neither a treatment nor a cure for rabies; it can only prevent the development of rabies in a person if given before the virus reaches the brain.  Because the rabies virus has a relatively long incubation period, post-exposure vaccinations are typically highly effective.

Additional doses 
Immunity following a course of doses is typically long lasting, and additional doses are usually not needed unless the person has a high risk of contracting the virus. Those at risk may have tests done to measure the amount of rabies antibodies in the blood, and then get rabies boosters as needed. Following administration of a booster dose, one study found 97% of immunocompetent individuals demonstrated protective levels of neutralizing antibodies after ten years.

Safety
Rabies vaccines are safe in all age groups. About 35 to 45 percent of people develop a brief period of redness and pain at the injection site, and 5 to 15 percent of people may experience fever, headaches, or nausea. Because of the certain fatality of the virus, receiving the vaccine is always advisable.

Vaccines made from nerve tissue are used in a few countries, mainly in Asia and Latin America, but are less effective and have greater side effects. Their use is thus not recommended by the World Health Organization.

Types
The human diploid cell rabies vaccine (HDCV) was started in 1967. Human diploid cell rabies vaccines are inactivated vaccines made using the attenuated Pitman-Moore L503 strain of the virus.

In addition to these developments, newer and less expensive purified chicken embryo cell vaccines (CCEEV) and purified Vero cell rabies vaccines are now available and are recommended for use by the WHO.   The purified Vero cell rabies vaccine uses the attenuated Wistar strain of the rabies virus, and uses the Vero cell line as its host.  CCEEVs can be used in both pre- and post-exposure vaccinations.  CCEEVs use inactivated rabies virus grown from either embryonated eggs or in cell cultures and are safe for use in humans and animals.

The vaccine was attenuated and prepared in the H.D.C. strain WI-38 which was gifted to Dr. Hilary Koprowski at the Wistar Institute by Dr. Leonard Hayflick, an Associate Member, who developed this normal human diploid cell strain.

Verorab, developed by Sanofi-Aventis and Speeda, developed by Liaoning Chengda are purified vero cell rabies vaccine (PVRV). The first is approved by the World Health Organization. Verorab is approved for medical use in Australia and the European Union and is indicated for both pre-exposure and post-exposure prophylaxis against rabies.

History

Virtually all infections with rabies resulted in death until two French scientists, Louis Pasteur and Émile Roux, developed the first rabies vaccination in 1885. Nine-year-old Joseph Meister (1876–1940), who had been mauled by a rabid dog, was the first human to receive this vaccine. The treatment started with a subcutaneous injection on 6 July 1885, at 8:00pm, which was followed with 12 additional doses administered over the following 10 days. The first injection was derived from the spinal cord of an inoculated rabbit which had died of rabies 15 days earlier. All the doses were obtained by attenuation, but later ones were progressively more virulent.

The Pasteur-Roux vaccine attenuated the harvested virus samples by allowing them to dry for five to ten days. Similar nerve tissue-derived vaccines are still used in some countries, and while they are much cheaper than modern cell culture vaccines, they are not as effective. Neural tissue vaccines also carry a certain risk of neurological complications.

Society and culture

Economics 

When the modern cell-culture rabies vaccine was first introduced in the early 1980s, it cost $45 per dose, and was considered to be too expensive. The cost of the rabies vaccine continues to be a limitation to acquiring pre-exposure rabies immunization for travelers from developed countries. It is possible and more cost-effective to split one intramuscular dose of the vaccine into several intradermal doses. This method is recommended by the World Health Organization (WHO) in areas that are constrained by cost or with supply issues. The route is as safe and effective as intramuscular according to the WHO.

Veterinary use

Pre-exposure immunization has been used on domesticated and wild populations. In many jurisdictions, domestic dogs, cats, ferrets, and rabbits are required to be vaccinated.

There are two main types of vaccines used for domesticated animals and pets (including pets from wildlife species):
 Inactivated rabies virus (similar technology to that given to humans) administered by injection
 Modified live viruses administered orally (by mouth): Live rabies virus from attenuated strains. Attenuated means strains that have developed mutations that cause them to be weaker and do not cause disease.

Imrab is an example of a veterinary rabies vaccine containing the Pasteur strain of killed rabies virus. Several different types of Imrab exist, including Imrab, Imrab 3, and Imrab Large Animal. Imrab 3 has been approved for ferrets and, in some areas, pet skunks.

Dogs
Aside from vaccinating humans, another approach was also developed by vaccinating dogs to prevent the spread of the virus. In 1979, the Van Houweling Research Laboratory of the Silliman University Medical Center in Dumaguete in the Philippines developed and produced a dog vaccine that gave a three-year immunity from rabies. The development of the vaccine resulted in the elimination of rabies in many parts of the Visayas and Mindanao Islands. The successful program in the Philippines was later used as a model by other countries, such as Ecuador and the Yucatan State of Mexico, in their fight against rabies conducted in collaboration with the World Health Organization.

In Tunisia, a rabies control program was initiated to give dog owners free vaccination to promote mass vaccination which was sponsored by their government. The vaccine is known as Rabisin (Mérial), which is a cell based rabies vaccine only used countrywide. Vaccinations are often administered when owners take in their dogs for check-ups and visits at the vet.

Oral rabies vaccines (see below for details) have been trialled on feral/stray dogs in some areas with high rabies incidence, as it could potentially be more efficient than catching and injecting them. However these have not been deployed for dogs at large scale yet.

Wild animals
Wildlife species, primarily bats, raccoons, skunks, and foxes, act as reservoir species for different variants of the rabies virus. This results in the general occurrence of rabies as well as outbreaks in animal populations.  Approximately 90% of all reported rabies cases in the US are from wildlife.

Oral rabies vaccine 
Oral rabies vaccines in pellet form are intended to be given to wild animals to produce a herd immunity effect. The development of safe and effective rabies virus vaccines applied in attractive baits resulted in the first field trials in Switzerland in 1978 to immunize red foxes.

There are currently two different types of oral wildlife rabies vaccine in use:
 Modified live virus: Attenuated vaccine strains of rabies virus such as SAG2 and SAD B19 
 Recombinant vaccinia virus expressing rabies glycoprotein: This is a strain of the vaccinia virus (originally a smallpox vaccine) that has been engineed to encode the gene for the rabies glycoprotein. It is mostly used in the USA (raccoons, foxes, and coyotes) and in western Europe (red foxes)

Other oral rabies experimental vaccines in development include recombinant adenovirus vaccines.

Oral rabies vaccination (ORV) programs have been used in many countries in an effort to control the spread of rabies and limit the risk of human contact with the rabies virus. ORV programs were initiated in Europe in the 1980s, Canada in 1985, and in the United States in 1990. ORV is a preventive measure to eradicate rabies in wild animal vectors of disease, mainly foxes, raccoons, raccoon dogs, coyotes and jackals, but also can be used for dogs in developing countries. ORV programs typically use edible baits to deliver the vaccine to targeted animals. ORV baits consist of a small packet containing the oral vaccine which is then either coated in a fishmeal paste or encased in a fishmeal-polymer block. When an animal bites into the bait, the packets burst and the vaccine is administered.  Current research suggests that if adequate amounts of the vaccine is ingested, immunity to the virus should last for upwards of one year.  By immunizing wild or stray animals, ORV programs work to create a buffer zone between the rabies virus and potential contact with humans, pets, or livestock.  The effectiveness of ORV campaigns in specific areas is determined through trap-and-release methods. Titer tests are performed on the blood drawn from the sample animals in order to measure rabies antibody levels in the blood.  Baits are usually distributed by aircraft to more efficiently cover large, rural regions.  In order to place baits more precisely and to minimize human and pet contact with baits, however, they are distributed by hand in suburban or urban regions.

ORV programs have seen success in preventing the westward spread of raccoon variant rabies in the United States and even eradicating rabies in red foxes in Switzerland.

The oral vaccine does not contain the whole rabies virus and has been proven safe in over 60 animal species including cats and dogs. The idea of wildlife vaccination was conceived during the 1960s, and modified-live rabies viruses were used for the experimental oral vaccination of carnivores by the 1970s. The potential for human contact with baits is a present concern for ORV programs, but the inactivated rabies vaccine cannot cause rabies, and the recombinant poxvirus vaccine is based on an attenuated poxvirus which is unlikely to cause serious disease in humans anyway. In the USA between 1990 and 2000, over 22 million doses of vaccinia-rabies were distributed, but there were only 160 incidents of people touching a vaccine bait, and only one resulted in a serious infection. The person in this case had been bitten by her dog while removing a bait from its mouth.

References

External links 
 
 
 

Animal vaccines
French inventions
Inactivated vaccines
Rabies
Vaccines
World Health Organization essential medicines (vaccines)
Wikipedia medicine articles ready to translate

fr:Rage (maladie)#Histoire des vaccins